Argulica is a village in the municipality of Karbinci, North Macedonia.

Demographics
According to the 2002 census, the village had a total of 315 inhabitants. Ethnic groups in the village include:

Gallery 

Macedonians 303
Turks 8
Aromanians 2
Others 2

References

Villages in Karbinci Municipality